Kaindy, formerly known as Trofimovka (until 2018), is a village (selo) in Zerendi District, Akmola Region, in northern part of Kazakhstan. The KATO code is 115652700.

Demographics

Population 
Population:  (17 males and 24 females). As of 2009, the population of Kaindy was 40 inhabitants (22 males and 18 females).

References

Notes

Populated places in Akmola Region